Chance Thomas Leo Sisco (born February 24, 1995) is an American professional baseball catcher in the Minnesota Twins organization. He has played in Major League Baseball (MLB) for the Baltimore Orioles and New York Mets.

Amateur career
Sisco initially attended Temescal Canyon High School in Lake Elsinore, California. Sisco transferred to Santiago High School in Corona, California for his junior year. Originally a shortstop and pitcher, he begin catching his senior year of high school. The Baltimore Orioles selected Sisco in the second round of the 2013 Major League Baseball draft. He opted to sign with the Orioles rather than play college baseball at the University of Oregon.

Professional career

Baltimore Orioles
Sisco made his professional debut that season for the Gulf Coast Orioles and ended the year with the Aberdeen IronBirds. He finished his first year hitting .363/.468/.451 with one home run and 11 RBIs in 33 games. Sisco played the 2014 season with the Delmarva Shorebirds. He won the SAL batting title after hitting .340 with five home runs, 63 RBIs and a .854 on-base plus slugging (OPS).

In 2015, Cisco played for the Frederick Keys and the Bowie Baysox where he batted a combined .297 with six home runs and 34 RBIs in 95 games. After the season he played in the Arizona Fall League. Sisco played 2016 with Bowie and the Norfolk Tides. In July, he played in the All-Star Futures Game. In 116 games between the two clubs he slashed .317/.403/.430 with six home runs and 51 RBIs. Sisco spent 2017 with Norfolk where he batted .267 with four home runs and 47 RBIs in 97 games before being recalled by Baltimore.

Sisco received his first-ever promotion to the Orioles on September 1, 2017. He made his MLB debut the following night as a defensive replacement in the ninth inning of a 7–2 loss to the Toronto Blue Jays at Camden Yards. He achieved his first major league hit with a pinch-hit double off Masahiro Tanaka in the seventh, then followed it up with his first home run off Giovanny Gallegos in his subsequent plate appearance two innings later in a 13–5 defeat to the New York Yankees at Yankee Stadium on September 14.

In 2018, Sisco made the Orioles opening day roster after hitting .419 in spring training. He was expected to be the backup catcher to Caleb Joseph. However, after batting only .218/.340/.328 in 47 games, he was optioned to Norfolk. He ended batting .181 on the season.

In 59 games for the Orioles in 2019, Sisco posted a batting line of .210/.333/.395 with career-highs in home runs (8) and RBI (20). In 2020 for the Orioles, Sisco slashed .214/.364/.378 with four home runs and ten RBI.

Sisco began the 2021 season sharing catching duties with Pedro Severino, but was optioned to Triple-A Norfolk in favor of Austin Wynns on May 31 after stumbling to a .154/.247/.185 batting line in 23 games. On June 18, 2021, Sisco was designated for assignment by Baltimore.

New York Mets
On June 25, 2021, Sisco was claimed off of waivers by the New York Mets. He was then optioned to the Triple-A Syracuse Mets. Sisco played in 5 games for the Mets, hitting .111 with 1 RBI. Sisco was designated for assignment by the Mets on September 28. On October 5, Sisco elected free agency.

Minnesota Twins
On March 16, 2022, Sisco signed a minor league deal with the Seattle Mariners that included an invite to spring training. On April 2, Sisco was released by the Mariners organization. He signed with the Minnesota Twins organization on April 4. He elected free agency on November 10, 2022.

On January 11, 2023, Sisco re-signed with the Twins organization on a minor league contract.

Personal life
Sisco and his wife, Jordan, married in 2018.

References

External links

1995 births
Living people
Sportspeople from Corona, California
Baseball players from California
Major League Baseball catchers
Baltimore Orioles players
New York Mets players
Gulf Coast Orioles players
Aberdeen IronBirds players
Delmarva Shorebirds players
Bowie Baysox players
Frederick Keys players
Peoria Chiefs players
Norfolk Tides players
Peoria Javelinas players
Syracuse Mets players